The 1941 George Washington Colonials football team was an American football team that represented George Washington University in the Southern Conference during the 1941 college football season. In its fourth season under head coach William Reinhart, the team compiled a 1–7–1 record (0–4–1 against conference opponents), finished in 14th place in the Southern Conference, and was outscored by a total of 176 to 31. The team played its home games at Griffith Stadium in Washington, D.C.

Schedule

References

George Washington
George Washington Colonials football seasons
George Washington Colonials football